The Kökbayraq ("sky flag"), anglicised as the Kokbayraq, is a flag unofficially used to represent the Xinjiang region of China and the historic region of East Turkestan in East Asia. The flag was originally used as the national flag of the short-lived breakaway state known as the First East Turkestan Republic (1933–1934). The Kökbayraq has a white crescent (young waning moon) with a five pointed star on blue background, it was adopted on 12 November 1933 as the national flag of the First East Turkestan Republic during Declaration of independence. With the exception of the blue background, the flag is identical to the Flag of Turkey. Uyghurs in Kyrgyzstan and Pakistan fly the flag as their ethnic flag.

Usage
In modern times it is popularly used as a symbol of the East Turkestan independence movement and is claimed by the East Turkistan Government in Exile to be the national flag of an independent East Turkestan. It is actively used by Uyghur activists in protests against China's genocide of Uyghurs and the re-education camp system in Xinjiang.

The light blue colour (background) is taken from the colour of the sky and is a predominant colour in Turkic culture that represents the sky, essentially the blue represents Turkic peoples. The crescent represents the notion of being victorious (un-defeatable) and is not necessarily an Islamic symbol, in-fact it was the Turks that introduced the crescent into the Islamic world. The star represents the Turkic nation, and is also found on the flag of the White Hun (Hephthalite) Empire and various other Turkic empires and states.

Dimensions

Gallery

See also 
 Emblem of East Turkestan
 Flag of Cyrenaica
 Flag of Tibet
 Flag of Turkey
 Second East Turkestan Republic

References 

Former countries in Chinese history
Obsolete national flags
East Turkestan
East Turkestan independence movement
East